Joseph von Auffenberg (25 August 1798 Freiburg – 25 December 1857 Freiburg) was a German dramatist.

Biography
After studying law in the Freiburg University, he entered the army, where he attained the rank of lieutenant of the horse guards. Several years afterward he became president of the committee of the court theatre at Karlsruhe.

Works
Among his more important productions are Pizzaro (1823), Ludwig XI in Peronne, Die Filibustier, Konich Erich, Das Opfer des Themistokles, Fergus MacIvor, Der Löwe von Kurdistan (1827), Alhambra and Das Nordlicht von Kasan. His collected works were published at Wiesbaden in 1855 in 22 volumes.

Notes

References
  This work in turn cites:
 Stahl, Joseph von Auffenberg (Hamburg and Leipzig, 1910)
 

1798 births
1857 deaths
University of Freiburg alumni
Writers from Freiburg im Breisgau
German male dramatists and playwrights
19th-century German dramatists and playwrights
19th-century German male writers
19th-century German writers